Woodmill High School is a local authority ran high school in Dunfermline, Scotland. It is one of the city's four high schools.

Designs were proposed for the school in 1958 and construction finished in 1960. It was built to serve the expanding estates of Abbeyview, Touch, Brucefield and Garvock. The name Woodmill comes from the former purpose of the land it was built on. It was initially a secondary school, but was upgraded to full high school status in 1968. The catchment area includes Duloch, Carnegie, Touch and Linburn.

Former pupils 

Singer and actress Barbara Dickson attended the school in the early 1960s. She dedicated her debut album to Sandy Sadler, one of her music teachers at Woodmill. In her autobiography, she quotes Sadler as telling her "you may not be the best singer in the class, but you are certainly the loudest".

Former pupil Murray McCallum has played international rugby union for Scotland.

Possible replacement 
Fife Council has confirmed that they are replacing the current school buildings. A March 2019 proposal suggested building a new campus, which would host Woodmill, St Columba's Roman Catholic High School, and Fife College.

2019 fire 
 
Woodmill was seriously damaged by a large fire which started on 25 August 2019 which was reported on 5:05 p.m. and continued to burn to the next day. The fire originally started in the school's Department of Additional Support (DAS) which was for people who needed additional support with learning difficulties. The fire completely destroyed everything in the DAS and had spread over other parts of the school including the E, F and G corridors, the cafeteria and the catwalk.

Over 80 firefighters fought the fire, many of those firefighters came from different parts of Scotland. During the fight with the fire, surrounding homes around the area had their water supply affected as the firefighters used many hydrants which affected the local water supply.

Aftermath and local impact 
The school was closed on 26 August 2019. Fife Council announced a plan to determine where pupils and staff would work and learn on 31 August. All 1400 pupils were back in full-time education at other schools and sites across West Fife just 5 days after the fire.

Following the blaze, a 14-year-old boy was charged with wilful fire raising. The boy's father turned him in to the police.

The local community provided additional support to pupils. £9000 was raised in a crowdfunding campaign hosted on Just Giving by over 470 backers which has superseded the original £1000 goal.

The school reopened in January 2020.

References

External links 
 
 Woodmill High School, Fifedirect, Fife Council

Secondary schools in Fife
Buildings and structures in Dunfermline
School fires
Educational institutions established in 1960
1960 establishments in Scotland
2019 fires in the United Kingdom
2019 in Scotland